Kathleen Ayensu (born 1953) served as Attorney General of the British Virgin Islands  from 24 June 2007 to 24 June 2010. She hails from Ghana. Before becoming the islands' AG, she was the chief state attorney in Accra at the Ministry of Justice, and spent ten years practising law in Washington, D.C.

References

1953 births
Living people
20th-century Ghanaian lawyers
21st-century British Virgin Islands lawyers
Attorneys general of the British Virgin Islands
Ghanaian emigrants to the British Virgin Islands
Ghanaian emigrants to the United States